Nora Meister (born 6 January 2003) is a Swiss Paralympic swimmer who competes in international elite events. She is a double World bronze medalist and a four-time European champion in freestyle and backstroke swimming.

References

2003 births
Living people
People from Lenzburg
Paralympic swimmers of Switzerland
Swiss female freestyle swimmers
Swiss female backstroke swimmers
Medalists at the World Para Swimming Championships
Medalists at the World Para Swimming European Championships
Swimmers at the 2020 Summer Paralympics
Medalists at the 2020 Summer Paralympics
Paralympic bronze medalists for Switzerland
Paralympic medalists in swimming
People with arthrogryposis
S6-classified Paralympic swimmers
Sportspeople from Aargau
21st-century Swiss women